The 2014–15 Rice Owls men's basketball team represented Rice University during the 2014–15 NCAA Division I men's basketball season. The Owls, led by first year head coach Mike Rhoades, played their home games at Tudor Fieldhouse and were members of Conference USA. They finished the season 12–20, 8–10 in C-USA play to finish in a four way tie for seventh place. They advanced to the quarterfinals of the C-USA tournament where they lost to Louisiana Tech.

Previous season
The Owls finished the season 7–23, 2–14 in C-USA play to finish in last place. They lost in the first round of the C-USA tournament to North Texas.

Departures

Offseason Departures

In-Season Departures

Incoming Transfers

Recruiting class of 2014

Recruiting class of 2015

Roster

Schedule

|-
!colspan=9 style="background:#002469; color:#5e6062;"| Exhibition

|-
!colspan=9 style="background:#002469; color:#5e6062;"| Regular season

|-
!colspan=9 style="background:#002469; color:#5e6062;"| Conference USA tournament

|-

See also
2014–15 Rice Owls women's basketball team

References

Rice Owls men's basketball seasons
Rice